Javed Siddiqi (13 January 1942) is a Hindi and Urdu screenwriter, dialogue writer and playwright from India. He has written over 50 storylines, screenplays and dialogues.

During his career, Siddiqi has collaborated with some of India's most prominent filmmakers, from independent directors like Satyajit Ray and Shyam Benegal to commercial directors like Yash Chopra and Subhash Ghai. He has become an integral part of Indian cinema, in both commercial and art cinema fields.

Siddiqi has won two Filmfare Awards, two Star Screen Awards, and one BFJA Award.
In 2010, he announced his association with Tumbhi where he would review artists and their artwork.

Cinema and television
After having graduated in Urdu Literature from Rampur, Javed Siddiqi moved to Bombay (now Mumbai) in 1959, where he worked as a professional journalist for various Urdu dailies like Khilafat Daily and Inquilaab. Soon after that, he went on to lead his own newspaper, Urdu Reporter.

He started his career as a dialogue writer in Satyajit Ray's Shatranj Ke Khilari in 1977.

Since then, he has been highly regarded for his works in different genres of film making, including art films of parallel cinema, like Umrao Jaan, Mammo, Fiza, Zubeidaa and Tehzeeb; as well as commercial hits, such as Baazigar, Darr, Yeh Dillagi, Dilwale Dulhania Le Jayenge, Raja Hindustani, Pardes, Chori Chori Chupke Chupke and Koi... Mil Gaya.

He has also written scripts for serials like Shyam Benegal's Bharat Ek Khoj, Ramesh Sippy's Kismet, Yash Chopra's Waqt and others.

Theatre
Siddiqi has been very successful in the field of theatre as well. From serving IPTA as a National Vice-President, he later contributed to the origin and functioning of the Marathi IPTA as well, and has been associated with it as a national member.

His play Tumhari Amrita, an adaptation of A R Gurney's classic American play Love Letters attained cult success. It had only two actors (Shabana Azmi and Farooque Shaikh) reading out letters to each other with neither change of set or costume. It ran for 21 years until Farooque Shaikh's death on December 28, 2013, and is one of the longest running plays in India. Since its debut at Prithvi Theatre on February 27, 1992, the play has been performed all over the world, including a special performance at the United Nations, the first Indian play to do so.

This was followed by Saalgirah, starring actress Kirron Kher, a play dealing with the complexity of divorce in modern urban life.

Siddiqi has successfully ventured into various domains, from Bertolt Brecht to more contemporary themes in his adaptations. He has adapted Bertolt Brecht's play Puntilla and several of his other works. His play Andhe Choohe based on Agatha Christie's Mousetrap, is one of the world's longest-running dramas. In the words of critic Vijay Nair, "Javed Siddiqi's lines are as poignant as ever. They leap out of the letters as little gems. At times they plead with the incoherence of hurts long stifled. At times they flare up like little flames scorching the audience. At times they soothe like fresh raindrops after a scorching summer. But at all times they have a life of their own and make their presence felt like an invisible third character on stage. His play 1857: Ek Safarnama set in Indian Rebellion of 1857 was also stage at Purana Qila, Delhi ramparts by Nadira Babbar and National School of Drama Repertory company, in 2008.

Over the years he has written numerous plays, including Hamesha, Begum Jaan, Aap Ki Soniya and Kacche Lamhe.

Personal life
Javed Siddiqi belongs to the family of great freedom fighters, Mohammad Ali Jouhar and his brother  Maulana Shaukat Ali well known as the Ali brothers. His great grandfather Hafiz Ahmed Ali Shauq was a historian and had written a number of books, he was the first librarian of Shahi Qutub Khana now known as Raza Library. His father Shujaat Ali, had served in the same library as an assistant librarian for a long time.

His early education was in Rampur’s Hamid High School and Jaame-ul-uloom, Furqaniah. He passed his high school in English in Aligarh Muslim University. 
At a very early age of 17, he migrated to Bombay and under the able guidance of his uncle Maulana Zahid Shaukat Ali, Javed started his career as a journalist in his Urdu newspaper Khilafat Daily. He then proceeded to work in newspapers such as Inquilab and Hindustan and then started his own newspaper named Urdu Reporter. 

Siddiqi started his career in films as a dialogue writer and assistant director to Satyajit Ray in Shatranj Ke Khilari. He also assisted James Ivory as chief assistant director.

Siddiqi has four children: Murad, Lubna, Sameer and Zeba. Lubna Salim, and Sameer Siddiqui are both involved in the film and theatre arena.

Urdu literature
In 2012, Siddiqi wrote a book of pen sketches named Roshandan. The book was published from Delhi and later on it was republished from AJJ, Karachi. A comprehensive review on the book was written by Karachi-based writer and researcher on Ibne Safi, Rashid Ashraf which was published in Karachi renowned Urdu magazine Quarterly Ijra in 2012.

Siddiqi started the second part of Roshandan with the first pen sketch on Satyajit Ray (Kya Admi Tha Ray) which was published in Mumbai's literary magazine Naya Warq and later on in Ajj, Karachi, March 2013.

Awards
 1994 Filmfare Award for Baazigar Best Screenplay
 1996 Filmfare Award for Dilwale Dulhania Le Jayenge Best Dialogues
 1996 Screen Award for Raja Hindustani Best Screenplay

List of works

Film writer
Shatranj Ke Khilari (1977)
Bara (Sookha) (1980)
Ali Baba aur 40 Chor (1980)
 Umrao Jaan(1981) (dialogue) 
Chakra (1981)
Sohni Mahiwal (1984)
Do Dilon Ki Dastaan (1985) 
Naam O Nishan (1987) 
Mar Mitenge (1988) 
Aakhri Adaalat (1988) 
Shukriyaa (1988)
Guru (1989)
Ilaaka (1989) 
Baaghi A Rebel for Love (1990) 
Anjali (1990)
Adharm (1992) (dialogue)
Baazigar (1993) 
Dhanwaan (1993)
Darr (1993) 
Mammo (1994) 
Chauraha (1994) 
Yeh Dillagi (1994) 
Zamaana Deewana (1995)
Gaddaar (1995)  
Hum Dono (1995) 
Dilwale Dulhania Le Jayenge (1995) 
Chaahat (1996) 
Raja Hindustani (1996)
Pardes (1997) 
Duplicate (1998) 
Jab Pyaar Kisise Hota Hai (1998)
Angaaray (1998) 
Barood (1998) 
Soldier (1998) 
Dahek A Burning Passion (1998) 
Dil Kya Kare (1999) 
Taal (1999) 
Tera Jadoo Chal Gayaa (2000) 
Fiza (2000) 
Raju Chacha (2000) 
Zubeidaa (2001) 
Chori Chori Chupke Chupke (2001) 
Albela (2001)
Kya Yehi Pyaar Hai (2002)
Pyaar Diwana Hota Hai (2002) 
Hum Kisi Se Kum Nahin (2002)
Koi Mil Gaya (2003) 
Zameen (2003) 
Tehzeeb (2003) 
Dil Maange More (2004)  
Blackmail (2005) 
Banaras (2006) 
Humko Tumse Pyar Hai (2006) 
Dus Kahaniyan (2007) 
Sadiyaan (2010)
Battle Of Saragahi

Plays
Tumhari Amrita
Saalgirah
Hamesha
Begum Jaan
Aap ki Soniya
Kacche Lamhe
 Dhuaan
 Aur Agle Saal
 Kate hue Raaste
 Patjhad se Zara Pehle
 Shyam Rang
 Who Ladki
 Raat
 Mogra
 Maati Kahe Kumhar Se
 Peele Patton ka Ban
 Kharaashein
 Lakeerein
 Humsafar
 Gudamba

References

External links
 

Living people
Indian male screenwriters
Indian male dramatists and playwrights
Screenwriters from Mumbai
Muslim writers
Indian Muslims
Urdu-language writers from India
Filmfare Awards winners
1942 births
Indian television writers
20th-century Indian dramatists and playwrights
20th-century Indian male writers
Male television writers